Desbiens may refer to:

 Desbiens, Quebec, a ville in the Canadian province of Quebec
Caroline Desbiens, Canadian politician
 Guillaume Desbiens, Canadian ice hockey player
 Jean-Paul Desbiens, Quebec writer, journalist, teacher 
 Laurent Desbiens, former French cyclist